Roznov may refer to:
Rožnov pod Radhoštěm, Czech Republic
Roznov, Neamț, Romania
Roznov, Texas